

The IAR-825 Triumf is a Romanian-designed tandem multirole trainer aircraft based on the IAR-823 built for the Romanian Air Force. The aircraft is roughly in the same class with the Brazilian EMBRAER Tucano. The IAR-825 is equipped with the Canadian Pratt & Whitney Canada PT6 turboprop engine. The type's first flight took place on the 12 June 1982. 

Only one prototype aircraft exists, formerly registered YR-IGB. It was sold and registered in the US in 2006 as N825BA. It was damaged in a forced landing on July 15, 2012.  It is currently registered by the Federal Aviation Authority as airworthy and active on the US civil aircraft register website as at November 2019.

Operators

Romanian Air Force

Specifications (IAR-825)

See also

References

1980s Romanian military trainer aircraft
825
Aircraft first flown in 1982